Wendell Howes Meade (January 18, 1912 – June 2, 1986) was an American attorney and politician who served as a Republican member of the United States House of Representatives from Kentucky's 7th Congressional District during the Eightieth Congress (January 3, 1947–January 3, 1949).

Early life and education
Meade, born in Paintsville, Kentucky, attended high school at the Kentucky Military Institute in Lyndon before attending Western State Teachers College in Bowling Green from 1930 to 1933. After leaving Western, he engaged in the banking business from 1933 to 1936. Meade graduated from University of Louisville School of Law in 1939 and was admitted to the bar the same year; opening a law practice in Paintsville.

Career 
Before his election to congress, Meade was a practicing lawyer in Paintsville, Kentucky, and served as a lieutenant in the United States Navy from November 1943 until January 1946.

Meade held several elected and appointed political positions. Elected to the Eightieth Congress in 1947, he served one term before he was unseated by Carl D. Perkins in 1948. He was an unsuccessful candidate for the Republican gubernatorial nomination in 1951. Meade was zone operations commissioner for the Federal Housing Administration from 1957 to 1961;Kentucky's commissioner of personnel from 1968 to February 1969; and a member of the Kentucky Workman's Compensation Board from 1969 to 1970.

Personal life 
During his later years, Meade was a resident of Richmond, Kentucky. Meade died in Lexington on June 2, 1986.

References

1912 births
1986 deaths
Kentucky lawyers
People from Paintsville, Kentucky
University of Louisville School of Law alumni
Western Kentucky University alumni
Republican Party members of the United States House of Representatives from Kentucky
20th-century American politicians
20th-century American lawyers